Gyebangsan is a mountain between the counties of Hongcheon and Pyeongchang, Gangwon-do in South Korea.

The vascular plants of the mountain have been listed according to the 'Red List' of the IUCN. They include Iris minutoaurea Makino.

See also
 List of mountains in Korea

Notes

References
 

Mountains of South Korea
Pyeongchang County
Hongcheon County
Mountains of Gangwon Province, South Korea
One-thousanders of South Korea